The 2005–06 Wichita Thunder season was the 14th season of the CHL franchise in Wichita, Kansas.

Regular season

Division standings

Awards

See also
2005–06 CHL season

References

External links
2005–06 Wichita Thunder season at Hockey Database

Wichita Thunder seasons
Wich